Ang Bagong Dugo Sa Lumang Ugat – Unang Kabanata is an EP by Filipino rock band Wolfgang, released on 3 August 2012. It is the last album to feature longtime bassist Mon Legaspi, who died on 3 October 2022.

Track listing

Personnel
 Sebastian "Basti" Artadi – vocals
 Manuel Legarda – guitar
 Ramon "Mon" Legaspi – bass
 Francis Aquino – drums

References

External links
 Wolfgang official website (archived)

2012 EPs
Wolfgang (band) albums